"Oh My God!" is a song written by the Moniker which he performed at Melodifestivalen 2011. The song made it through Andra chansen to the final inside the Stockholm Globe Arena where it ended up third.

The song entered Svensktoppen on 17 April 2011

An alternate lyrics version in Swedish, "Göteborgslåten", is about the town of Gothenburg.

Charts

References

Melodifestivalen songs of 2011
2011 singles
2011 songs